Airborne Assault: Highway to the Reich is a video game released in 2003.

Release
Airborne Assault: Highway to the Reich was released by Panther Games and Matrix Games on 1 December 2003.

Reception

Its unit-level artificial intelligence was praised as allowing "competent execution by groups of forces in pursuit of terrain-based objectives". 

The editors of Computer Gaming World nominated Highway to the Reichs computer version for their 2003 "Wargame of the Year" award, which ultimately went to Decisive Battles of WWII: Korsun Pocket. They wrote, "Highway to the Reich shows that war gaming is moving in exciting new directions".

Reviews
Computer Gaming World - Feb, 2004

References

2003 video games
Computer wargames
Matrix Games games
Video games about Nazi Germany
Video games developed in Australia
Windows games
Windows-only games
World War II video games